Bernd Höing  (born 4 March 1955) is a German rower, who competed for the SC Dynamo Berlin / Sportvereinigung (SV) Dynamo. He won the medals at the international rowing competitions.

References 

1955 births
Living people
People from East Berlin
Rowers from Berlin
East German male rowers
Olympic rowers of East Germany
Rowers at the 1980 Summer Olympics
Olympic medalists in rowing
Olympic gold medalists for East Germany
World Rowing Championships medalists for East Germany
Recipients of the Patriotic Order of Merit in silver
Medalists at the 1980 Summer Olympics
20th-century German people